Carbon is a 2017 French crime film directed by Olivier Marchal.

Plot
Antoine Roca is threatened with losing the family road transport business. After talking to his accountant and friend Laurent Melki, he came up with the idea of VAT fraud on carbon quotas in the European Union . For that, he contacts two acquaintances of poker evenings more accustomed to frauds, the brothers Éric and Simon Wizman as well as their mother, Dolly. To get started in their schemes, however, this small band needs funds. Since Antoine is toast in the Jewish community because of his wealthy stepfather, Aron Goldstein, they have to borrow from a figure of organized crime, Kamel Dafri.

Cast 
 Benoît Magimel - Antoine Roca 
 Laura Smet - Noa Van Strecht
  - Éric Wizman
 Gringe - Simon Wizman
 Michaël Youn - Laurent Melki  
 Gérard Depardieu - Aron Goldstein

Production

Genesis and Development
The scenario is inspired by the VAT fraud on carbon quotas that allegedly took place between 2008 and 2009 3 . The screenwriter Emmanuel Naccache was initially also to be the director. Olivier Marchal was then to play the police officer Moser. The project did not materialize until a few years later, under the leadership of producer Manuel Munz.

Distribution of Roles
For this new film, Olivier Marchal has surrounded himself with several actors he has already met: Benoît Magimel who was his partner in Truands , Michaël Youn with whom he shares the poster of My beloved brother on France 2 , Patrick Catalifo which he directed in Les Lyonnais et Borderline and Gérard Depardieu which he directed in 36 quai des Orfèvres. Gérard Depardieu and Benoît Magimel meet again, after having played together in the television series Marseille.

References

External links 

2017 crime films
French crime films
2010s French-language films
Films directed by Olivier Marchal
2010s French films